The Deener House is a historic house at 310 East Center Street in Searcy, Arkansas.  It is a -story Bungalow/Craftsman style house that was designed by noted Arkansas architect Charles L. Thompson and built in 1912.  It has the low-slung appearance typical of the Bungalow style, with a side gable roof that extends across its full-width front porch, where it is supported by fieldstone piers, and shows exposed rafters.  Three small gable-roof dormers are closely spaced near the center of the otherwise expansive roof.

The house was listed on the National Register of Historic Places in 1982.  The Hicks-Dugan-Deener House, next door at 306 E. Center Street, is also listed.

See also
National Register of Historic Places listings in White County, Arkansas

References

Houses on the National Register of Historic Places in Arkansas
Houses completed in 1912
Houses in Searcy, Arkansas
American Craftsman architecture in Arkansas
Bungalow architecture in Arkansas
1912 establishments in Arkansas
National Register of Historic Places in Searcy, Arkansas